Lísek is a municipality and village in Žďár nad Sázavou District in the Vysočina Region of the Czech Republic. It has about 400 inhabitants.

Administrative parts
Villages of Lhota and Vojtěchov are administrative parts of Lísek.

References

Villages in Žďár nad Sázavou District